Raffaella Petrini (born 15 January 1969) is an Italian religious sister of the congregation of the Franciscan Sisters of the Eucharist and a Roman Curia official.

Biography
She was born in Rome on 15 January 1969 and graduated with a degree in Political Science from the Libera Università Internazionale degli Studi Sociali Guido Carli of Rome. She received a doctorate from the Pontifical University of Saint Thomas Aquinas (Angelicum), where she was later appointed professor of Welfare Economics and Sociology of Economic Processes. She also studied organizational behavior at the University of Hartford (Connecticut), receiving a masters degree in 2001.
 
From 2005 to 2021 she has worked on the staff of the Congregation for the Evangelization of Peoples.

On 4 November 2021, Pope Francis appointed her to be the first woman to hold the office of Secretary General of the Pontifical Commission for Vatican City State. He noted that since she held the number two position in the governorship of Vatican City, Petrini had become the highest-ranking woman in the world's smallest state.

On 13 July 2022, Pope Francis appointed women as members of the Dicastery for Bishops for the first time, two religious sisters and one consecrated virgin: Raffaella Petrini, Yvonne Reungoat, and María Lía Zervino.

References 

1969 births
Living people
21st-century Italian Roman Catholic religious sisters and nuns
Franciscan nuns
Women officials of the Roman Curia
Members of the Congregation for the Evangelization of Peoples
Pontifical University of Saint Thomas Aquinas alumni
Libera Università Internazionale degli Studi Sociali Guido Carli alumni
Academic staff of the Pontifical University of Saint Thomas Aquinas